George Frank Boney (July 3, 1930 – August 30, 1972) was a justice of the Supreme Court of Alaska from December 2, 1968, until his death. He was the court's second chief justice following the retirement of Buell A. Nesbett in 1970, becoming the youngest chief justice of any state supreme court at the time. He died in a boating accident at Cheri Lake, in present-day Houston, Alaska. The older of the two state courthouses in Anchorage, the one in which the Supreme Court holds its sessions, is named in his honor.

References

1930 births
1972 deaths
Accidental deaths in Alaska
Boating accident deaths
Justices of the Alaska Supreme Court
Politicians from Anchorage, Alaska
People from Savannah, Georgia
Lawyers from Anchorage, Alaska
Chief Justices of the Alaska Supreme Court
20th-century American judges
20th-century American lawyers